The Costa del Maresme is a section of the Catalan coast that coincides with the coast of the Maresme region and covers a total of sixteen municipalities from Montgat to the mouth of the Tordera (Malgrat de Mar). It is bordered on the north by the Costa Brava and on the south by the Costa de Barcelona.

The Costa del Maresme stretches between the Mediterranean Sea and the Catalan Coastal Range, which protects it from the north winds. The Costa del Maresme has extensive beaches, fishing villages and towns with a long history of tourism. Characterized by its mild climate and its Mediterranean landscape, it is a residential and tourist area that in recent decades has hosted many people from cities who have moved their first residence to the coast.

The region has five marinas and fishing activity is mainly concentrated in and around Arenys de Mar. For this reason, Arenys and Sant Pol de Mar have been distinguished as fishing villages by the Catalan Tourism Agency.

Beaches of the Maresme 

They range from urban beaches - with all kinds of services like restaurants, bars and casinos - to more natural beaches far away from urban centers. Some have been awarded the Blue Flag, others have been recognized as having a commitment to sustainability Biosphere and others certified with the Q for Tourist Quality. Some locations have also been certified as Family Beach destinations and offer facilities and services specially designed for family guests.

From southwest to northeast, they are:

Marinas 
There are a total of five ports along the cost with most of them of being meant for sporting.

From southwest to northeast, they are:

References

Maresme
Tourism in Catalonia